The 1963 European Touring Car Challenge was the inaugural season of what would become the European Touring Car Championship. On 16 June 1963, the first race was staged on the classic  Nürburgring Nordschleife circuit. After a hillclimb event at Mont Ventoux, the challenge headed to England for two races, as classes were divided between events at Brands Hatch and Mallory Park. Round five was hosted by the brand new Zolder circuit, then the challenge crossed the border into the Netherlands and on to Zandvoort. Another hillclimb at the Timmelsjoch for round seven, and the final would be held behind the Iron Curtain, in Hungary.

Although the challenge was a success, the point-scoring systems used weren't. The first challenge left us with five drivers sharing the top position, with Peter Nöcker, being declared the champion. This was because there were up to nine classes, all having their own separate race winners. This point system would remain right up to 1988 when the ETCC stopped.

The challenge had a lot of competitive cars, but not many of them were in the same class. On the other hand, speed differences were not that large, so a Mini was sometimes able to outpace many bigger cars.

European Touring Car Challenge 
Champion:  Peter Nöcker

Runner Up:  Wolf-Dieter Mantzel

Results

Table

The first five drivers finished level on points; the overall result of the Nürburgring was decisive... another contemporary report mentions "the ones with the most victories, Nöcker, Mantzel and Hahne were classified in the order of who had the biggest winner margin over second in class".

References

European Touring Car Championship seasons
European Touring Car